Yuzhne (formerly: Южний, Yuzhnyi, translated as "southern" n. adj.) is a port city in Odesa Raion, Odesa Oblast (province) of south-western Ukraine. It is situated on the country's Black Sea coast. Population: 

Initially created as a settlement of the Odesa Portside Plant in the Hryhorivka Estuary, since 1981 it was transformed into a suburb of Odesa within the Suvorovsky District of the city. From the Southern Marine Terminal of the city port, the Odesa–Brody pipeline takes its beginning towards the Western Ukraine.

The city's port Pivdennyi (formerly Yuzhnyi) is an internationally important oil terminal, and one of Ukraine's top three ports, with Odesa and Chornomorsk. In fact, these three nearby port cities have grown into a single conurbation, and Yuzhne is considered a satellite of Odesa.

Name 
Although it sounds awkward in Ukrainian, the city's name has not changed since Ukraine obtained its independence. The Ukrainian term for "Southern" would be Pivdenne.

Nonetheless, on 11 May 1978 by the order of the Presidium of the Verkhovna Rada (parliament) of the Ukrainian SSR the newly built populated place was given the name of the village Yuzhne. Starting from this event the place takes its beginning. In February 1993 the Verkhovna Rada (the national parliament of Ukraine) declared to give the urbanized village a special status in the Odesa Oblast as a city of oblast significance. In 2000 the declaration of Verkhovna Rada #1914-III confirmed the city limits.

Climate 
Yuzhne has a humid subtropical climate (Köppen: Cfa).

Sport 
Yuzhne is home to the team BC Khimik in the Ukrainian Basketball Superleague, league champions in the 2014/15 season. Yuzhne is also home to the "BK Khimik" women's volleyball team, Ukrainian champions in 2010/11 and 2011/12. The handball team named HC Portovik plays in the highest men's League.

Gallery

See also 
 Odesa–Brody pipeline

References

External links 
 Information portal of Yuzhny town 
 Website of the Port of Yuzhny 

Cities in Odesa Raion
Kherson Governorate
Port cities and towns in Ukraine
Port cities of the Black Sea
Populated places established in the Ukrainian Soviet Socialist Republic
1978 establishments in Ukraine
Populated places established in 1978
Socialist planned cities
Cities in Odesa Oblast